The 1966 Atlanta Falcons season was the franchise's inaugural season in the National Football League (NFL). The Falcons finished in seventh place in the NFL Eastern Conference with a record of 3–11, ahead of only the New York Giants.

Offseason 
The Falcons attempted to acquire Green Bay Packers running back Jim Taylor. There were tensions in Green Bay because the Packers first round pick, Jim Grabowski would be groomed to take over for Taylor. The signing of Grabowski upset Taylor but he stated he would leave Green Bay once his contract expired, therefore the Falcons could not acquire the running back.

NFL Draft 

Due to the addition of the team for the 1966 NFL Season, the Falcons were allotted the first pick in all twenty rounds of the 1966 NFL draft, as well as five compensatory picks and the end of the first five rounds.

Personnel

Staff

Roster

Regular season 
The Falcons played their first game (preseason) on August 1, 1966, against the Philadelphia Eagles before a crowd of 26,072 at Atlanta Stadium, a two-point Falcons loss, 9–7. In their inaugural regular season, Atlanta played each of the fourteen other teams in the league once. The Falcons lost their first nine regular season games; their first win was on the road against the New York Giants, 27–16, on November 20. Former Giant Ernie Wheelwright scored two touchdowns receiving and ran for 51 more yards as QB Randy Johnson hit for a trio of touchdowns.

Their first ever home victory was over the St. Louis Cardinals, 16–10, before 57,169 on December 11. The Falcons ended their inaugural season at 3–11, yet Tommy Nobis won the NFL Rookie of the Year Award and became the first Falcon named to the Pro Bowl.

Schedule 

Note: Intra-conference opponents are in bold text.

Standings

Awards and records 
 Tommy Nobis, NFL Rookie of the Year

References

External links 
 1966 Atlanta Falcons at Pro-Football-Reference.com

Atlanta Falcons
Atlanta Falcons seasons
Atlanta